David James Psaltis (born December 14, 1927) is a former American football defensive back. He played professionally in the National Football League (NFL) for the Chicago Cardinals and the Green Bay Packers.

Early life
Psaltis was born in Chicago and attended Alameda High School in Alameda, California, where he played football and track and field. In high school, he won a championship for the shot put and discus in 1946. He played college football at San Jose State University and the University of Southern California (USC). He played for the USC Trojans when they the 1953 Rose Bowl.

Professional career
He was drafted in the second round (15th pick overall) of the 1953 NFL Draft by the Chicago Cardinals, and played that season with the Cardinals. The following season, he played with the Green Bay Packers before re-joining the Cardinals for the 1955 NFL season.

References

Further reading
 "The Redshirts: A Man and a Team That Fought for Their Destiny" by Rudy Bukich, published by AuthorHouse, Apr 16, 2012.

1927 births
Living people
American football defensive backs
Chicago Cardinals players
Green Bay Packers players
San Jose State Spartans football players
USC Trojans football players
Sportspeople from Alameda, California
Players of American football from California
Players of American football from Chicago